Galanin receptor 3 (GAL3) is a G-protein coupled receptor encoded by the GALR3 gene.

Function 

The neuropeptide galanin modulates a variety of physiologic processes including cognition/memory, sensory/pain processing, hormone secretion, and feeding behavior.  The human galanin receptors are G protein-coupled receptors that functionally couple to their intracellular effector through distinct signaling pathways.  GALR3 is found in many tissues and may be expressed as 1.4-, 2.4-, and 5-kb transcripts

See also 
 Galanin receptor

References

Further reading

External links 
 

G protein-coupled receptors